Lieutenant-Colonel Sir Henry Berkeley Fitzhardinge Maxse  (1832, Effingham Hill, England – 10 September 1883, St. John's, Newfoundland) was a Newfoundland colonial leader and a captain during the Crimean War.

Maxse was commissioned lieutenant in the Grenadier Guards in 1849 and transferred to the 13th Light Dragoons and then the 21st Foot in 1852. He was promoted captain in 1854 and transferred to the Coldstream Guards in 1855. He was promoted major in 1855 and lieutenant-colonel in 1863.

He was wounded at the Battle of Balaclava and received medals of honour for his service. He was lieutenant-governor of Heligoland in 1863 and appointed as governor the following year. Maxse became governor of Newfoundland in 1881.

Maxse was instrumental in the construction of the Newfoundland Railway. Most of his term as governor was spent in Germany with his wife, Auguste von Rudloff (d.1915). A noted German-language scholar, he published an English translation of Bismarck's Letters to his Wife and Sisters.

Maxse died as a result of the injuries he suffered at the Battle of Balaclava. He is buried in Brookwood Cemetery in Surrey.

See also
Governors of Newfoundland
List of people from Newfoundland and Labrador

External links
Biography at Government House The Governorship of Newfoundland and Labrador
Crimean War biographies
The Maxse Letter
Governors of Heligoland
IMDB movie The Charge of the Light Brigade (1968)

1832 births
1883 deaths
Governors of Newfoundland Colony
Lieutenant Governors of Heligoland
Grenadier Guards officers
Coldstream Guards officers
13th Hussars officers
Royal Scots Fusiliers officers
British Army personnel of the Crimean War
Knights Commander of the Order of St Michael and St George
Henry Berkekey
Burials at Brookwood Cemetery